Francisco Javier Huerta Franco (born 10 August 1947) is a Mexican former cyclist. He competed at the 1972 Summer Olympics and the 1976 Summer Olympics.

References

External links
 

1947 births
Living people
Mexican male cyclists
Olympic cyclists of Mexico
Cyclists at the 1972 Summer Olympics
Cyclists at the 1976 Summer Olympics
Place of birth missing (living people)
Pan American Games medalists in cycling
Pan American Games silver medalists for Mexico
Pan American Games bronze medalists for Mexico
Cyclists at the 1971 Pan American Games
21st-century Mexican people
20th-century Mexican people